Rača is a town and municipality located in the Šumadija District of central Serbia. According to  2011 census, the population of the town is 2,595, while population of the municipality is 11,475.

Demographics

Economy
The following table gives a preview of total number of employed people per their core activity (as of 2017):

See also
 Visak

References

External links

 

Populated places in Šumadija District
Municipalities and cities of Šumadija and Western Serbia